Violent is New Zealand band Stellar*'s fourth single, and their third single from their debut album Mix. This song won the "Single of the Year" award at the 2000 New Zealand "Tui" Music Awards. The song was featured on the Nature's Best 2 compilation of what were voted the top 100 New Zealand songs from 1926 until 2001 by APRA to celebrate their 75th anniversary. Judging by the track list, Violent was placed at #46 in this list. The single spent six weeks within the top 20 in the RIANZ singles charts, peaking at #11. The music video to the song was directed by Jonathan King, and depicts the band playing within a small room, amongst other scenes such as one which Runga plays the role of a nurse in surgery.

Track listing

Charts

Year-end charts

References

Stellar (New Zealand band) songs
1999 singles
Songs written by Boh Runga
1999 songs
Sony BMG singles